A Full House is a 1920 American silent comedy film directed by James Cruze and written by Alice Eyton based upon a play of the same name by Fred Jackson. The film stars Bryant Washburn, Lois Wilson, Guy Milham, Hazel Howell, Vera Lewis, and Beverly Travers. The film was released on October 24, 1920, by Paramount Pictures. It is not known whether the film currently survives, which suggests that it is a lost film.

Plot
As described in a film magazine, George Howell (Washburn), a young lawyer, sadly separates himself from his bride Ottilie (Wilson) on the second day after their wedding to fulfill a commission from his friend Ned Pembroke (Milham) to recover some incriminating love letters in the possession of a San Francisco showgirl. Ned will not propose to Daphne (Howell), Ottilie's sister, until the letters are safe in his hands. Allowing his wife to believe that he has gone to San Diego, George goes to San Francisco. On the return trip he accidentally exchanges his travelling bag with a crook who has stolen a wealthy woman's jewels. Once home, his wife discovers them among the burglary tools in his bag. Susie (Williams), a maid, sees them and calls the police, but later decides to try and earn the reward herself. The police surround the house, telling various people arriving at the scene that "you can go in but you can't come out." The thief returns to claim his loot and this gives rise to a continuation of skirmishes between the two men and the police, and in the end the real culprit is apprehended and the two couples find happiness.

Cast
Bryant Washburn as George Howell
Lois Wilson as Ottilie Howell
Guy Milham as Ned Pembroke
Hazel Howell as Daphne
Vera Lewis as Aunt Penelope
Beverly Travers as Vera Vernon
Lottie Williams as Susie
J.P. Wild as Parks 
Z. Wall Covington as Mooney
Frank Jonasson as King
Lillian Leighton as Mrs. Fleming

References

External links 

1920 films
1920s English-language films
Silent American comedy films
1920 comedy films
Paramount Pictures films
Films directed by James Cruze
American black-and-white films
American silent feature films
1920s American films